Andrea Brighenti (born 2 December 1987) is an Italian professional footballer who plays as a striker for  club Trento.

Club career

Early career
Born in Brenzone, in the Province of Verona, Veneto, Brighenti started his career at fifth division for semi-pro club Virtus Verona. In 2008, he made his fully professional debut for Pavia in 2008–09 Lega Pro Seconda Divisione. In 2009, he was signed by fellow fourth division club Sambonifacese. He scored 13 goals in 2011–12 Lega Pro Seconda Divisione, which he was transferred to Renate at the end of season.

Cremonese
On 12 July 2013 he was signed by Parma for undisclosed fee (€77,000 including other costs) but immediately swapped with Alessandro Favalli of Cremonese. Both clubs retained 50% registration rights of the players. The 50% registration rights were valued for €250,000, thus no cash was involved in the deal. Brighenti scored 13 times in his maiden season of the third division. He also played all 3 matches of the promotion playoffs, with a goal.

Monza
On 4 January 2019, he signed with Monza.

Juventus U23
On 2 September 2020, Brighenti joined Serie C club Juventus U23, the reserve club of Juventus, on a permanent deal. Brighenti's first goal for Juventus U23 came on 20 December, in a 2–1 loss against Pontedera, with a goal from the penalty spot.

Trento
On 26 August 2022, Brighenti signed a one-season contract with Trento.

Honours 
Monza
 Serie C Group A: 2019–20

Career statistics

Notes

References

External links
 
 AIC profile (data by football.it) 

1987 births
Footballers from Veneto
Sportspeople from the Province of Verona
Living people
Italian footballers
Association football forwards
F.C. Pavia players
A.C. Sambonifacese players
A.C. Renate players
U.S. Cremonese players
A.C. Monza players
Juventus Next Gen players
A.C. Trento 1921 players
Serie B players
Serie C players
Serie D players